Collecting the Kid is a compilation album by El-P. It was released through Definitive Jux on October 19, 2004.

The album is not intended as a direct follow-up to Fantastic Damage, but instead collects together various B-sides, instrumentals, film soundtracking work, and beats El-P has previously produced for other artists.

Critical reception
David Moore of Pitchfork gave the album a 5.9 out of 10, saying, "most of Collecting the Kid shows one of underground hip-hop's most consistently rewarding producers in a frustrating holding pattern." Justin Cober-Lake of PopMatters gave the album 5 stars out of 10, saying: "It largely sounds like the studio tomfoolery that much of it is, but there's enough spark in even that to keep anticipation up for El-P's next real work."

Track listing

References

External links
 
 

2004 compilation albums
El-P albums
Definitive Jux compilation albums
Albums produced by El-P